James McNamara (5 April 1893 – 21 August 1929) was an Irish association footballer and Gaelic footballer. His championship career at senior level with the Tipperary county team spanned eight years from 1918 to 1926.

McNamara made his debut on the inter-county scene at the age of twenty-five when he was selected for the Tipperary senior team, making his debut during the 1918 championship. The highlight of McNamara's inter-county career came in 1920 when he won an All-Ireland medal. He also won two Munster medals.

Honours
Tipperary
All-Ireland Senior Football Championship (1): 1920
Munster Senior Football Championship (2): 1918, 1920

References

1893 births
1929 deaths
Cahir Gaelic footballers
Irish businesspeople in retailing
Tipperary inter-county Gaelic footballers
Winners of one All-Ireland medal (Gaelic football)